Priyutovo is the name of several inhabited localities in Russia.

Urban localities
Priyutovo, Republic of Bashkortostan, a work settlement under the administrative jurisdiction of Priyutovsky Settlement Council in Belebeyevsky District of the Republic of Bashkortostan

Rural localities
Priyutovo, Karachevsky District, Bryansk Oblast, a village in Verkhopolsky Rural Administrative Okrug of Karachevsky District in Bryansk Oblast; 
Priyutovo, Navlinsky District, Bryansk Oblast, a village in Sokolovsky Rural Administrative Okrug of Navlinsky District in Bryansk Oblast; 
Priyutovo, Republic of Mordovia, a village in Zhegalovsky Selsoviet of Temnikovsky District in the Republic of Mordovia; 
Priyutovo, Orenburg Oblast, a selo in Sergiyevsky Selsoviet of Orenburgsky District in Orenburg Oblast